Grevillea polybotrya is a species of flowering plant in the family Proteaceae and is endemic to the south-west of Western Australia. It is an erect, bushy shrub with egg-shaped to lance-shaped leaves with the narrower end towards the base, and usually white to cream-coloured flowers.

Description
The edges of the leaves are thickened, both surfaces similar and more or less glabrous.

TaxonomyGrevillea polybotrya was first formally described in 1856 by Carl Meissner in de Candolle's Prodromus Systematis Naturalis Regni Vegetabilis from specimens collected in the Swan River Colony by James Drummond. The specific epithet (polybotrya) means "many bunches of grapes", referring to the inflorescences.

Distribution and habitat
This grevillea grows in heath on sandy soil from Geraldton to the Moore River and inland to Manmanning and Dalwallinu in the Avon Wheatbelt, Geraldton Sandplains, Swan Coastal Plain and Yalgoo bioregions of south-western Western Australia.

Conservation statusGrevillea polybractea'' is listed as "not threatened" by the Government of Western Australia Department of Biodiversity, Conservation and Attractions.

See also
 List of Grevillea species

References

polybotrya
Endemic flora of Western Australia
Eudicots of Western Australia
Proteales of Australia
Plants described in 1856